The Dingle International Film Festival (DIFF: Irish Gaelic: Féile Scannán Idirnáisiúnta an Daingin) was a film festival held annually in March that took place between 2007 and 2019 in Dingle, Ireland.

History 
Established in 2007 by Maurice Galway, the festival screened a number of films over the years, including the World Premiere of We'll Always Have Dingle, a documentary about Galway founding the festival. The film played in 2010 and again in 2011. Galway won the Gregory Peck award at the festival in 2019. 

Notable guests have included inventor Garrett Brown, Gabriel Bryne, Laura Dern,  Ned Dowd, Aidan Gillen, sound engineer Tom Johnson, Sarah Miles, Cillian Murphy, Barry Keoghan, Barbara Kopple,  Maureen O Hara, Sir Alan Parker, Jack Reynor, Saoirse Ronan, Jim Sheridan and  Scott Wilson.

Festival closing
The festival closed its door for financial reasons in July 2019.  The Animation Dingle Film festival, an "offshoot" of DIFF, will continue. The 2020 presentations, scheduled for 20–21 March 2020, was cancelled due to COVID-19 but winners were announced via a live-stream awards announcement presented by JAM Media.

Awards

The Gregory Peck Award for Excellence in the Art of Film 
The family of iconic Hollywood actor Gregory Peck presented a career achievement award at the festival. Peck's great grandmother Catherine Ashe hailed from Annascaul in the Dingle Peninsula.  Peck was a cousin to Thomas Ashe, founding member and battalion commander of the Irish Volunteers during the Easter Rising who later died in prison as the result of a hunger strike.

Notable recipients at Dingle IFF are Gabriel Byrne, Jim Sheridan, Jean Jacques Beineix, Stephen Frears and Laura Dern. In 2014, the Peck family began presenting the award at the San Diego International Film Festival in the actor's native hometown. Other recipients include Alan Arkin, Patrick Stewart, Annette Bening, Keith Carradine and Laurence Fishburne.

Animation awards 
In 2015, the festival held an awards ceremony in association with Animation Ireland. Recipients of the Murakami Award have included Jimmy T. Murakami, Richie Baneham, Tomm Moore and Don Bluth and Gary Goldman.

Non-competition events 
The Irish Film Board has hosted a selection of critically acclaimed Irish films.

Classic films like Ryan's Daughter (1970) have opened the festival.

Further reading 

 A Message from the President of Ireland  by Michael D. Higgins

References

External links 

 Official Site
 Official Facebook

Defunct film festivals
Film festivals in Ireland
Film festivals established in 2007
Spring (season) events in the Republic of Ireland
Festivals disestablished in 2019
2019 disestablishments in Ireland
2007 establishments in Ireland
March events
Dingle